Mats Berggren (born 1957, in Södertälje) is a Swedish writer. He specializes in children's and young adult literature.

He has been a jury member of the Astrid Lindgren Memorial Award.

Selected works 
1987 – Orent ackord
1989 – När blodrosen slår ut
1991 – Kalsonger med gröna älgar
1993 – Bilder från ett osynligt Sverige (photographs by Lars Lind)
1993 – Varken varken eller eller
1994 – Välfärdslandet?: 18 röster från Sverige i dag (editor)
1995 – Trosor med röda rosor
1999 – Blåögd
2000 – Behå med vita spetsar
2001 – Sent ute (with Bawer Coskun)
2002 – Det finns inga skridskor i öknen
2004 – Svennehora (with Dea Berisha)
2006 – En enda kväll
2008 – Sista berättelsen om oss
2011 – Språkresan
2013 – Jag ljuger bara på fredagar
2014 – Onsdag kväll strax för sju
2015 – Generation 55+
2017 – Din syster måste dö

References

External links

Website 

1957 births
People from Södertälje
Swedish male writers
Swedish children's writers
Swedish novelists
Living people